Hunter Labrada is an American bodybuilder. He has qualified to compete at the 2022 Mr. Olympia. He is son of bodybuilder Lee Labrada.

Rankings 

 2020 Mr. Olympia: 8th place
 2021 Mr. Olympia: 4th place, winning $40,000

References 

Living people
American bodybuilders
Year of birth missing (living people)